Kenneth Alan Lobb (also credited as Ken Lobb, KAL, and K. Lobb) is an American video game designer formerly employed by Taxan USA Corp., Namco Hometek, and Nintendo of America, and currently employed by Xbox Game Studios as Creative Director. He is best known as co-creator of the Killer Instinct series.

Lobb was employed as Product Manager of Taxan USA between October 1988 and January 1991,  where he worked alongside Japanese developer KID on various NES games made for the U.S. market. After Taxan closed down in early 1991, Lobb was then employed by Namco Hometek until 1993, where he was Head of Product Development. The same year Lobb began working at Nintendo of America, where he worked on several games, including GoldenEye 007. Whilst at Nintendo Lobb worked as Head of Game Development for Nintendo of America. Shortly after the resignation of Minoru Arakawa from Nintendo in January 2002, Lobb left to join Microsoft Game Studios. Lobb commented in a 2007 interview with IGN that had Arakawa not left the company he would have been less likely to leave.

A weapon in GoldenEye 007, the Klobb, was named after him due to last-minute copyright issues, and became notorious amongst gamers for its lackluster abilities. Despite this, Lobb stated that it "ended up having a nice impact on me, personally".

Works

 Burai Fighter (NES, 1990)
 Low G Man (NES, 1990)
 G.I. Joe (NES, 1990)
 Rolling Thunder 2 (Genesis, 1991) - Hometek Team
 G.I. Joe: The Atlantis Factor (NES, 1992) - (uncredited)
 Kick Master (NES, 1992)
 Splatterhouse 2 (Genesis, 1992) - Special Thanks
 Wings 2: Aces High (SNES, 1992) - Producer
 Super Batter Up (SNES, 1992) - Special Thanks
 Splatterhouse 3 (Genesis, 1993) - Special Thanks
 Super Punch-Out!! (SNES, 1994) - Special Thanks
 Donkey Kong Country (SNES, 1994) - Special Thanks
 Killer Instinct (Arcade, 1994) - Game Design, Character Voices
 Killer Instinct 2 (Arcade, 1996) - Character Voices, Additional Design, Special Thanks
 Cruis'n USA (N64, 1996) - Special Thanks
 Donkey Kong Country 3: Dixie Kong's Double Trouble! (SNES, 1996) - Special Thanks
 Tetrisphere (N64, 1997) - Product Coordinator
 Donkey Kong Land III (GB, 1997) - Special Thanks
 GoldenEye 007 (N64, 1997) - NOA Treehouse Staff
 Diddy Kong Racing (N64, 1997) - NOA Thanks To
 Cruis'n World (N64, 1997) - NOA Producer
 Blast Corps (N64, 1997) - NOA Staff
 Banjo-Kazooie (N64, 1998) - NOA Big Thanks
 Star Wars Episode I: Racer (N64/GBC) - Thanks to Nintendo of America
 R-Type DX (GBC, 1999) - Special Thanks
 The New Tetris (N64, 1999) - Special Thanks
 NBA 3 on 3 Featuring Kobe Bryant (N64, 1999) - Special Thanks
 Mickey's Racing Adventure (GBC, 1999) - Thanks
 Ken Griffey Jr.'s Slugfest (N64/GBC, 1999) - Special Thanks
 Jet Force Gemini (N64, 1999) - NOA Thanks To
 Duke Nukem: Zero Hour (N64, 1999) - Special Thanks
 Donkey Kong 64 (N64, 1999) - Special Thanks
 Conker's Pocket Tales (GBC, 1999) - NOA Special Thanks
 Command & Conquer (N64, 1999) - Executive Producer
 Perfect Dark (N64, 2000) - NOA Staff
 Alice in Wonderland (GBC, 2000) - NOA Special Thanks
 Voodoo Vince (Xbox, 2003) - Special Thanks
 Fable: The Lost Chapters (Xbox, 2004)- Special Thanks
 Shadowrun (Xbox 360, 2007) - Special Thanks
 Crackdown 2 (Xbox 360, 2010) - Designer
 Killer Instinct (Xbox One, 2013) - Supervisor, voice of Chief Thunder
 Ori and the Blind Forest (Xbox One/Xbox 360/Windows 10, 2015) - Special Thanks
 Quantum Break'' (Xbox One/Windows 10, 2016) - Business

References

External links
 Ken Lobb's profile at MobyGames

Year of birth unknown
American male voice actors
American video game designers
Microsoft employees
Video game artists
Video game designers
Video game producers
Living people
Year of birth missing (living people)